Wayne Collins (born 4 March 1969) is an English football midfielder.

Club career

Crewe Alexandra
Collins began his career at Crewe Alexandra and made 117 league appearances.

Sheffield Wednesday
Collins signed for Premier League side Sheffield Wednesday in August 1996. He went on to score 6 goals in 31 league appearances for the club, before being sold to Fulham, then in the third tier of English football, in January 1998.

Fulham
At Fulham Collins helped them to two promotions. He made five league appearances during Fulham's 2000/01 season after which they were promoted to the Premier League.

Later career
In Summer 2001 Collins returned to Crewe Alexandra, where he scored once against Manchester City, and also had a spell at Stockport County.

References

Since 1888... The Searchable Premiership and Football League Player Database (subscription required)

1969 births
Living people
English footballers
Association football midfielders
Premier League players
Winsford United F.C. players
Crewe Alexandra F.C. players
Sheffield Wednesday F.C. players
Fulham F.C. players
Stockport County F.C. players
English Football League players